Gambusia is a large genus of viviparous fish in the family Poeciliidae (order Cyprinodontiformes). Gambusia contains over 40 species, most of which are principally found in freshwater habitats, though some species may also be found in brackish or saltwater habitats. The genus Gambusia comes from the Cuban term, "Gambusino", which means "free-lance miner". The type species is the Cuban gambusia, G. punctata. The greatest species richness is in Mexico, Texas, and the Greater Antilles, but species are also found elsewhere in the eastern and southern United States, the Bahamas, Central America, and Colombia. Gambusia species are often called topminnows, or simply gambusias; they are also known as mosquitofish, which, however, refers more specifically to two species, G. affinis and G. holbrooki, which are often introduced into ponds to eat mosquito larvae. As a consequence, they have been introduced widely outside their native range, and frequently become invasive, threatening local species. They are only occasionally kept in aquariums, due to their relative lack of color and the highly aggressive nature of the aforementioned mosquitofish species.

The genus Gambusia comes from the Cuban term, "Gambusino", which means "free-lance miner".

Nine species are listed as vulnerable in the IUCN Red List; one, the widemouth gambusia, G. eurystoma, is critically endangered; and two, the Amistad gambusia, G. amistadensis, and the San Marcos gambusia, G. georgei, are already extinct.

Species
The 45 currently recognized species in this genus are:
 Gambusia affinis (S. F. Baird & Girard, 1853) (mosquitofish, western mosquitofish)
 Gambusia alvarezi C. Hubbs & V. G. Springer, 1957 (yellowfin gambusia)
 †Gambusia amistadensis Peden, 1973 (Amistad gambusia)
 Gambusia atrora D. E. Rosen & R. M. Bailey, 1963 (blackfin gambusia)
 Gambusia aurata R. R. Miller & W. L. Minckley, 1970 (golden gambusia)
 Gambusia baracoana Rivas, 1944
 Gambusia beebei G. S. Myers, 1935 (Miragoane gambusia)
 Gambusia bucheri Rivas, 1944
 Gambusia clarkhubbsi G. P. Garrett & R. J. Edwards, 2003 (San Felipe gambusia)
 Gambusia dominicensis Regan, 1913 (Dominican gambusia)
 Gambusia echeagarayi (Álvarez, 1952) (Maya gambusia)
 Gambusia eurystoma R. R. Miller, 1975 (widemouth gambusia)
 Gambusia gaigei C. L. Hubbs, 1929 (Big Bend gambusia)
 Gambusia geiseri C. Hubbs & C. L. Hubbs, 1957 (largespring gambusia)
 †Gambusia georgei C. Hubbs & Peden, 1969 (San Marcos gambusia)
 Gambusia heterochir C. Hubbs, 1957 (Clear Creek gambusia)
 Gambusia hispaniolae W. L. Fink, 1971 (Hispaniolan gambusia)
 Gambusia holbrooki Girard, 1859 (eastern mosquitofish)
 Gambusia hurtadoi C. Hubbs & V. G. Springer, 1957 (crescent gambusia)
 Gambusia krumholzi W. L. Minckley, 1963 (spotfin gambusia)
 Gambusia lemaitrei Fowler, 1950
 Gambusia longispinis W. L. Minckley, 1962 (Cuatrocienegas gambusia)
 Gambusia luma D. E. Rosen & R. M. Bailey, 1963 (sleek mosquitofish)
 Gambusia manni C. L. Hubbs, 1927
 Gambusia marshi W. L. Minckley & Craddock, 1962 (robust gambusia)
 Gambusia melapleura (P. H. Gosse, 1851) (striped gambusia)
 Gambusia monticola Rivas, 1971
 Gambusia myersi C. G. E. Ah, 1925
 Gambusia nicaraguensis Günther, 1866 (Nicaraguan mosquitofish)
 Gambusia nobilis (S. F. Baird & Girard, 1853) (Pecos gambusia)
 Gambusia panuco C. L. Hubbs, 1926 (Panuco gambusia)
 Gambusia pseudopunctata Rivas, 1969 (Tiburon Peninsula gambusia)
 Gambusia punctata Poey, 1854 (Cuban gambusia)
 Gambusia puncticulata Poey, 1854 (Caribbean gambusia)
 Gambusia quadruncus Langerhans, Gifford, Domínguez-Domínguez, García-Bedoya & T. J. DeWitt, 2012
 Gambusia regani C. L. Hubbs, 1926 (Forlon gambusia)
 Gambusia rhizophorae Rivas, 1969 (mangrove gambusia)
 Gambusia senilis Girard, 1859 (blotched gambusia)
 Gambusia sexradiata C. L. Hubbs, 1936 (teardrop mosquitofish)
 Gambusia speciosa Girard, 1859 (Tex-Mex gambusia)
 Gambusia vittata C. L. Hubbs, 1926 (Gulf gambusia)
 Gambusia wrayi Regan, 1913 (Wray's gambusia)
 Gambusia xanthosoma D. W. Greenfield, 1983 (Cayman gambusia)
 Gambusia yucatana Regan, 1914 (Yucatán gambusia)
 Gambusia zarskei M. K. Meyer, Schories & Schartl, 2010

Notes

References

External links

 

 
Freshwater fish genera
Freshwater fish of Central America
Freshwater fish of South America
Freshwater fish of Mexico
Live-bearing fish
Ray-finned fish genera
Poeciliidae
Taxa named by Felipe Poey